Nokia 1610 is a mobile phone model manufactured by Nokia. It complemented the Nokia 2110 business model, but had significantly fewer features. It was introduced in April 1996 and released in May and became highly popular at the time.

The phone had a monochromatic display which could show two rows of text at a time. The operating manual did not mention a possibility to send text messages, but at least units sold from 1996 and onwards included the function. The SMS capable version was called 1610 Plus. The phone used an external rigid antenna, but had a groove on the inside of the battery to accommodate a pull-out type antenna. The 1610 used a credit card size SIM-card, and was powered by a NiMH type battery with a capacity of 600 mAh.

1610